Skill: National Bureau for Students With Disabilities (Used to be called National Bureau for Handicapped Students) is a UK charity promoting opportunities for people with any kind of disability in post-16 education, training and employment across the UK.

Skill was established in 1974; By Ronald E. Sturt. Skill: National Bureau for Students with Disabilities is a company limited by guarantee and a registered charity.

History 
National Bureau for Students with Disabilities (SKILL) was established by Ronald E. Sturt in 1974. A librarian who founded the talking newspaper in Britain. Since 1974, SKILL has been helping people over 16 with disabilities to lead an independent life.

References

External links 
Website 

Educational organisations based in the United Kingdom
Disability organisations based in the United Kingdom